In the Fields of Dreams (Finnish: Unelma karjamajalla) is a 1940 Finnish drama film directed by Teuvo Tulio and starring Sirkka Salonen, Olga Tainio and Kaarlo Oksanen. It is a remake of the 1933 Swedish film People of Hälsingland.

Cast
 Sirkka Salonen as 	Sirkka Valkama
 Olga Tainio as 	Lady of Ylitalo
 Kaarlo Oksanen as Ylitalon Aarne 
 Kyösti Erämaa as Ylitalon Urho
 Kirsti Hurme as 	Kirsti Turja
 Aku Peltonen as 	Matti
 Varma Lahtinen as 	Aino
 Eino Jurkka as 	Shopkeeper
 Ida Kallio as 	Kerttu
 Väinö Kangas as Judge
 Evald Terho as 	Old gypsy
 Taito Mäkelä as	Prosecutor
 Timo Jokinen as 	Sirkka's son
 Lauri Korpela as 	Antti 
 Veikko Laakso as Jailer

References

Bibliography 
 Sundholm, John. Historical Dictionary of Scandinavian Cinema. Scarecrow Press, 2012.

External links 
 

1940 films
Finnish drama films
1940 drama films
1940s Finnish-language films
Films directed by Teuvo Tulio
Remakes of Swedish films